Rang Badalti Odhani is an Indian soap opera which aired on STAR One Monday to Saturday evenings. The show premiered on 5 April 2010. It starred Karan Tacker and Yashashri Masurkar in the lead roles and was produced under the banner of Beyond Dreams Entertainment and Inspire Films by Yash A Patnaik.
The series showcased performances of the leads on various iconic Bollywood numbers that garnered attention at the time.

Overview

Khanak (Yashashri Masurkar) is a simple, spirited young woman hailing from a small village named Dhulwad in Bhuj, (Gujarat), newly married to her sweetheart, Suraj (Harpreet Singh). In a tragic accident, Suraj is killed. The man who caused Suraj's death is Shantanu Khandelwal (Karan Tacker), the younger son of a business tycoon called Sunil Khandelwal (Aliraza Namdar). Under pressure from the village council (panchayat) of Dhulwadi, Shantanu marries Khanak and takes her to his home in the city. Khanak struggles to adjust to the unfamiliar environment, while Shantanu learns to accept his responsibilities. Meanwhile, Shantanu's arrogant mother Madhavi (Rushali Arora) and sister-in-law Khushboo (Khushboo Grewal) conspire to separate him from Khanak. They fail in their attempts as Shantanu and Khanak eventually fall in love with one another. How Khanak becomes a loved member of the family despite it all, and love blossoms between her and Shantanu form the crux of the story.

Cast

Leads 
 Karan Tacker as Shantanu Khandelwal 
 Yashashri Masurkar as Khanak Shantanu Khandelwal

Recurring Cast 
 Rucha Gujarathi  as Natasha
 Ansha Sayed as Jenny
 Harpreet Singh as Suraj / Sunny
 Pankaj Dheer as Sarpanch
 Sahil Anand as Akshay Khandelwal
 Shivani as Hetal
 Khushboo Grewal as Khushboo Khandelwal
 Aliraza Namdar as Sunil Khandelwal
 Rushali Arora as Madhavi Sunil Khadelwal
 Priyanka Bassi as Samaira
 Rushad Rana as Akshay Khandelwal
 Manish Raisinghani as Rahul Khanna
 Madhurima Tuli as Khushi
 Jaskaran Gandhi as Duck
 Karan Godhwani as Adi
 Garima Bhatnagar as Simran
 Bhavana Balsavar  as Gangu Bai
 Priyanka Chibber as Natasha
 Drashti Dhami as Geet
 Sidharth Shukla as Veer

Guest Appearances 
Manini Mishra as Saraswati
 Hiten Tejwani as  Anand Mittal

Music
The score of Rang Badalti Odhani is composed and orchestrated by  Shankar–Ehsaan–Loy which received the award for Best Title Music/Song Track at the 11th Indian Television Academy Awards. Besides the score, there are two songs - "Rang Badalti Odhani", the opening theme, and "Hua Mann Bawra", where one of the leads perform in a concert. "Hua Mann Bawra" features Ehsaan Noorani of the composer trio.

References

External links

Star One (Indian TV channel) original programming
Serial drama television series
2010 Indian television series debuts
2011 Indian television series endings